The girls' tournament at the 2014 Summer Youth Olympics was held at the Youth Olympic Sports Park from 17–26 August 2014.

Results
All times are China Standard Time (UTC+08:00)

Preliminary round

Pool A

Pool B

Classification match

Ninth and tenth place

Medal round

Quarterfinals

Fifth to eighth place classification

Crossover

Seventh and eighth place

Fifth and sixth place

First to fourth place classification

Semi-finals

Bronze-medal match

Gold-medal match

Goalscorers

References

Field hockey at the 2014 Summer Youth Olympics